Jesus 'Kiki' Rojas (born 31 January 1964 in Rio Caribe, Sucre) is a former professional boxer in the super flyweight division from Venezuela.

Boxing career 
Rojas turned professional in 1985 and captured the WBA flyweight title with a decision win over Fidel Bassa in 1989. He lost the title in his first defense to Yul-Woo Lee by decision in 1990. Later that year he took on Leopard Tamakuma again for the WBA flyweight title, but drew with him. 
He later moved up in weight and challenged WBA super flyweight title holder Yokthai Sithoar in 1997, but lost a decision. In 1998 he captured the WBA super flyweight title, with a decision win over Satoshi Iida. He lost the title in 1999 to Hideki Todaka and later retired in 2004 after a loss to Eric Morel.

See also 
 List of flyweight boxing champions
 List of super-flyweight boxing champions

External links 
 

1964 births
Living people
People from Sucre (state)
Flyweight boxers
Super-flyweight boxers
World flyweight boxing champions
World super-flyweight boxing champions
World Boxing Association champions
Venezuelan male boxers